The chevron skink (Oligosoma homalonotum) (Māori: niho taniwha), is a large species of skink endemic to New Zealand, found only on Great and Little Barrier islands in the Hauraki Gulf. A cryptic forest dweller, it can hide underwater, and is under threat from introduced rats.

Taxonomy 
The chevron skink (Oligosoma homalonotum) was described in 1906.

In 1996, the narrow-bodied skink (Oligosoma gracilicorpus) was assessed as "Data Deficient" by the IUCN Red List. In 2018, the IUCN regarded Oligosoma gracilicorpus as a synonym of the chevron skink (Oligosoma homalonotum).

Distribution 
First described in 1906, the museum type specimen was mislabelled as coming from Flat Island in the Mokohinau group, so the species was not located again until 70 years later, when Hardy found 13 specimens on Great Barrier Island. It seems likely that chevron skinks were once found on the northern North Island: subfossil remains of large skinks have been recovered from Tokerau Beach and Waipu, and large lizards were reported from the Hokianga in the early 20th century. Like many New Zealand lizards, introduced predators have confined them to offshore islands as "pseudoendemics".

Description 
The specific epithet, "homalonotum", means "smoothed backed". O. homalonotum is light reddish brown in colour, becoming grey on the neck and head, with distinctive black markings under the chin. The common name of the species has its origins in the distinctive chevrons along its back and tail; these arrow-shaped markings all point towards the head of the animal. The longest New Zealand lizard, it can grow to lengths of 30 cm including the tail, with a SVL (Snout–Vent Length) of 143 mm.

Ecology 
Although active during the day, the chevron skink is very secretive and well camouflaged against a background of fern fronds or leaf litter. It is prone to dehydration, so prefers to live on forested stream margins. It is able to retreat underwater and hold its breath to avoid predators, and will climb vegetation and hide to escape flash floods. Juveniles seem to prefer the banks of rocky streams, living in debris dams and rock crevices, and adults are occasionally found in trees. Chevron skinks eat invertebrates such as spiders, insect larvae, and small snails. Litters of up to eight young are produced in late summer–early autumn.

Conservation status
Up to the 1990s, there had only been 100 or so sightings of this species, so a research programme led by the  Department of Conservation (DOC) began to assess its conservation status. In 2012, DOC classified the chevron skink as Nationally Vulnerable under the New Zealand Threat Classification System.

The largest population is on Great Barrier Island, in at least 20 catchments, where they coexist with pigs, feral cats, mice, and two species of rats. They are extremely secretive, with catch frequencies of approximately one found every 400 trap-days. Conservation efforts have focused on education, pig control, and intensive predator control in certain areas.

Only two chevron skinks have been seen on Hauturu (Little Barrier), one after over 20,000 trap days of effort. Cats have already been removed from  Little Barrier Island, and DOC have proposed removing kiore (Rattus exulans).

References

External links 

 Oligosoma homalonotum in the 2006 IUCN Red List of Threatened Species.

homalonotum
Reptiles described in 1906
Reptiles of New Zealand
Endemic fauna of New Zealand
Taxa named by George Albert Boulenger
Taxonomy articles created by Polbot